The Metropolitan Police of Greater London, England is organised into four main directorates, each with differing responsibilities. These are Frontline Policing (formerly Territorial Policing), Met Operations (formerly Specialist Crime & Operations), Specialist Operations, Professionalism and six civilian staffed support departments under the umbrella of Met Headquarters. Each is overseen by an Assistant Commissioner, or in the case of a support department a director of police staff which is the equivalent civilian grade.

The Management Board, responsible for the strategic direction of the MPS, is composed of the senior police leadership including the Commissioner, Deputy Commissioner, the four Assistant Commissioners (for Met Operations, Frontline Policing, Specialist Operations and Professionalism) and five directors.

Leadership
 the senior leadership rank-holders of the MPS are:

The highest rank in the MPS is that of the Commissioner, the operational leader; however the MPS is accountable to the Mayor's Office for Policing and Crime on a pan-London basis and the Home Secretary on a national policing basis.

Appointments to the most senior ranks of assistant commissioner and above are made in consultation with the Mayor of London and the Home Secretary, with the appointment of the Deputy Commissioner and Commissioner being formally made by the monarch.

Frontline Policing
The Frontline Policing Directorate, formerly known as Territorial Policing, is commanded by Assistant Commissioner Louisa Rolfe, who is responsible for providing the day-to-day local policing of Greater London (excluding the City of London), the police area defined in legislation as the Metropolitan Police District.

Basic Command Unit (BCU) 
Historically the Metropolitan Police District's territory was divided into divisions grouped into districts and later divisions grouped into areas. In 2000 this was replaced by a system of one Borough Operational Command Unit (BOCU) for each of the thirty-two post-1965 London boroughs, each commanded by a chief superintendent. In early 2018, largely due to police funding constraints, it was announced that there would be a radical shake up of local policing in London to replace the BOCUs established in 2000.  Over the following 12 months all 32 BOCUs would be merged with others to form 12 Basic Command Units (BCUs).  This followed a trial of two 'pathfinder' BCUs, Central North BCU consisting of the old Islington and Camden BOCUs, and the East Area BCU consisting of the old Barking & Dagenham, Havering and Redbridge BOCUs.

Each BCU is provided with:

 Telephone and Digital Investigation Unit (TDIU): Provides initial over-the-phone investigation of crime; it is either resolved or passed on to the other teams for further investigation
 Local Resolution Team (LRT): Provides remote investigation and resolution work for non-crime incidents or incidents not requiring an immediate physical response
 Safer Neighbourhood Teams (SNTs): Made up of uniformed officers and PCSOs who are responsible for local long term community interaction and problem solving.
 Emergency Response & Patrol Team (ERPT): Provides the majority of the physical responses to 999 or 101 calls, primarily investigates volume crime
Criminal Investigation Department (CID): Detectives investigate more serious and complex crimes beyond the scope of ERPT's; for crimes outside even the CID's remit, it is transferred to the Specialist Crime Command (non-BCU Frontline Policing)
Violence Suppression Units (VSU): Plain-clothes officers dedicated to specific BCUs, aimed at reducing street crime.  

The 12 BCU structure consists of the following boroughs:

There has been significant concerns raised in various quarters over these changes.

Non-BCU Frontline Policing 
As of February 2019 the non-BCU units within Frontline Policing were:

Met Operations
Met Operations or Met Ops is one of the four business groups which forms the Metropolitan Police Service. It was created during the 2018–19 restructuring of the service, amalgamating much of its functions from the previous Specialist Crime & Operations Directorate.  the group is led by Temporary Assistant Commissioner Matt Twist.

It consists of several branches:

Specialist Operations
Specialist Operations (SO) is a directorate of the Metropolitan Police Service, responsible for providing specialist policing capabilities. Until Sir Kenneth Newman's restructuring of the Metropolitan Police, SO comprised twenty units, but after the restructuring most of them were absorbed by Central Operations (now Met Operations).

SO is headed by an Assistant Commissioner (Matt Jukes ), with two deputy assistant commissioners and three commanders.

SO is currently organised into three commands:

Protection Command
Split into the following specialist operational areas:
Parliamentary and Diplomatic Protection (PaDP)
Royalty and Specialist Protection (RaSP)

Security Command
Security Command is headed by a Commander ( Simon Dobinson). The command comprises:
Aviation Security Operational Unit (SO18)
Protective Security Operations – ensures that there are adequate protective security arrangements in place for major events, crowded places, iconic sites and that key utilities and sites where hazardous substances are located are securely protected.

Counter Terrorism Command

Formed by the merger of Special Branch and the Anti-Terrorist Branch. The priority of this command is to keep the public safe and to ensure that London remains a hostile environment for terrorists. Their responsibilities include: bringing to justice anyone engaged in terrorism or related offences, preventing and disrupting terrorist activity, gathering and exploiting intelligence on terrorism and extremism in London.

Professionalism
This portfolio, commanded  by Assistant Commissioner Barbara Gray, continues the work of A10, an anti-corruption department set up by Commissioner Robert Mark in 1971. An Anti-Corruption and Abuse Command was added in October 2022.

Digital and Technology
Formerly known as Digital Policing and falling under Met Headquarters, this is led by the Chief Digital and Technology Officer (Darren Scates, acting), who heads directors for:
 Service Delivery
 Technology and Business Engagement 
 Solution Delivery

Met Headquarters
Headed by the Chief of Corporate Services (Roisha Hughes, acting), its senior team includes a CONNECT SRO, a director without portfolio, a deputy assistant commissioner (Corporate Services) and a director each for:

 Media and Communication
 Legal Services
 Human Resources
 Strategy & Governance
 Transformation
 Property Services (formerly known as Portfolio and Planning)
 Finance
 Commercial

Its remit also includes Shared Support Services.

Film Unit
The MPS Film Unit was launched within Shared Support Services in 2006 and manages the commercial filming schedule across London on behalf of local councils and major production companies including MGM as well as producers for various film and TV commercials.  The Film Unit is based in Southwark and is maintained by current serving police officers.  The unit provides operational officers to ensure security for film companies and the general public.  It is part of the Film London Partnership which is supported by the Department of Culture, Media and Sport, the Mayor of London and Film London.

Police officer strength by rank
The following table gives the police strength in the MPS by rank.

Total workforce
The following table gives the workforce numbers in the MPS.

Notes

References

Metropolitan Police